The Tibet Military District is a military district of the People's Liberation Army Ground Force. It was first established in 1952, possibly from elements previously part of the 18th Corps. In December 1968 it became part of the Chengdu Military Region.

The former Tibet Military Region was reduced to the status of a district in 1971.

Current formation 
52nd Mountain Combined Arms Brigade (山地合成第52旅)
53rd Mountain Combined Arms Brigade (山地合成第53旅)
54th Heavy Combined Arms Brigade (重型合成第54旅)
85th Special Operation Brigade (特战第85旅)
85th Army Aviation Brigade (陆航第85旅)
85th Artillery Brigade (炮兵第85旅)
85th Air-Defense Brigade (防空第85旅)
85th Engineer and Chemical Brigade (工化第85旅)
7th Electronic Countermeasure Brigade (电子对抗第7旅)
351st Border-Defense Regiment (边防第351团)
352nd Border-Defense Regiment (边防第352团)
353rd Border-Defense Regiment (边防第353团)
354th Border-Defense Regiment (边防第354团)
355th Border-Defense Regiment (边防第355团)
356th Border-Defense Regiment (边防第356团)
357th Border-Defense Regiment (边防第357团)
358th Border-Defense Regiment (边防第358团)

Commanders 
 Zhang Guohua, February 1952 - July 1968
 Zeng Yongya, July 1968 - November 1970
 Chen Mingyi, November 1970 - November 1973
 Qie Jinwu, November 1973 - May 1978
 Zhang Guirong, May 1978 - August 1983
 Jiang Hongquan, August 1983 - September 1992
 Zhou Wenbi, September 1992 - September 1996
 Meng Jinxi, September 1996 - August 2004
 Dong Guishan, August 2004 - July 2008
 Shu Yutai, July 2008 - December 2009
 Yang Jinshan, December 2009 - July 2013
 Xu Yong, July 2013 - December 2019
 Wang Haijiang, December 2019 - March 2021
 Wang Kai, (Since March 2021)

References 

 
Military districts of the People's Republic of China
Military units and formations established in the 1970s